Isthmomys is a genus of rodent in the family Cricetidae, belonging to the tribe Reithrodontomyini. Species are:

Yellow isthmus rat (Isthmomys flavidus)
Mount Pirri isthmus rat (Isthmomys pirrensis)

References

Further reading

Anthony, H. E. 1916. Panama Mammals Collected in 1914–1915. Bulletin of the American Museum of Natural History 35: 357–377.
Bangs, Outram. 1902. Chiriqui Mammalia: Megadontomys flavidus. Bulletin of the Museum of Comparative Zoology at Harvard College 8: 27–29.
Carleton, M. D. 1980. Phylogenetic relationships in neotomine-peromyscine rodents (Muroidea) and a reappraisal of the dichotomy within New World Cricetinae.
Cuartas-Calle, Carlos Auturo and Javier Muñoz-Arango. 2003. Lista de los Mamiferos (Mammalia: Theria) del departamento de Antioquia, Colombia. Biota Colombiana 4, no. 1: 65–78.
Goldman, Edward. 1912. New Mammals from Eastern Panama. Smithsonian Miscellaneous Collections 60, no. 2: 1–18.
Goldman, Edward. 1920. Mammals of Panama. Smithsonian Miscellaneous Collections 69, no. 5.
Goodwin, George G. 1946. Mammals of Costa Rica. Bulletin of the American Museum of Natural History 87, no. 5.
Hall, E.R. and K.R. Kelson. 1958 The Mammals of North America. New York: Ronald Press Co.
Handley, Charles. 1966. Checklist of the Mammals of Panama. In Ectoparasites of Panama, ed. Wenzel and Tipton:753–796. Chicago, Illinois: Field Museum of Natural History.
Hooper, Emmet T. and Guy Musser. 1964. Notes on the classification of the rodent genus Peromyscus. Occasional Papers of the Museum of Zoology, University of Michigan, no. 635.
Linzey, Alicia  and James N. Layne. 1974. Comparative morphology of spermatozoa of the rodent genus Peromyscus (Muridae). American Museum Novitates, no. 2532.
Linzey, Alicia and James N. Layne. 1969. Comparative morphology of the male reproductive tract in the rodent genus Peromyscus (Muridae). American Museum Novitates, no. 2355: 1–46.
Middleton, John R. 2007.  A Systematic Revision of Genus Isthmomys (Rodentia: Cricetidae).  Master's Thesis, Texas Tech University, Lubbock Texas.
Stangl, F. B.  and R. J. Baker. 1984. Evolutionary relationships in Peromyscus: congruence in chromosomal, genic, and classical data sets. Journal of Mammalogy 65, no. 4: 643–654.

 
Rodent genera
Taxa named by Guy Musser
Taxonomy articles created by Polbot